Emmanuele Brancaccio, O.S.B. (died 1686) was a Roman Catholic prelate who served as Bishop of Ariano (1667–1686).

Biography
Emmanuele Brancaccio was ordained a priest in the Order of Saint Benedict. 
On 6 March 1667, he was appointed during the papacy of Pope Alexander VII as Bishop of Ariano.
He served as Bishop of Ariano until his death in 1686.

Episcopal succession
While bishop, he was the principal co-consecrator of:
Marcantonio Vincentini, Bishop of Foligno (1669);
Filippo Alferio Ossorio, Bishop of Fondi (1669); and
Fulgenzio Arminio Monforte, Bishop of Nusco (1669).

References

External links and additional sources
 (for Chronology of Bishops) 
 (for Chronology of Bishops) 

17th-century Italian Roman Catholic bishops
Bishops appointed by Pope Alexander VII
Bishops of Ariano
1686 deaths
Benedictine bishops